Vlasotince is a town and municipality located in Jablanica District of southern Serbia. As of 2011, the municipality has 29,669 inhabitants, while the town itself has a population of 15,830 inhabitants.

History
According to Turkish records, the town existed in the 15th century as a Turkish administrative center. After the Turks were forced out of Serbia, locals started growing wine grapes as a kind of complementary business to their building activities. They made Vlasotince the number one wine region in the former Yugoslavia and furthermore the biggest wine exporter in the Balkans. The craftsmanship and building skills of workers and builders from this region were appreciated in the former Yugoslavia and its surrounding neighbours until the Yugoslav Wars.

Settlements
Aside from the town of Vlasotince, the municipality includes the following settlements:

Demographics

According to the 2011 census results, the municipality of Vlasotince has a population of 29,893 inhabitants.

Ethnic groups
The ethnic composition of the municipality:

Economy
The following table gives a preview of total number of registered people employed in legal entities per their core activity (as of 2018):

Notable people
 Aleksandar Davinić, journalist
 Bogoljub Mitić Đoša, actor and comedian
 Nenad Filipović, athletics
 Predrag Filipović, athletics
 Slaviša Stojanović, football coach
 Tihomir Stanojević, police commander
 Borivoje Šurdilović (Šurda), the main character of Vruć vetar

See also
Subdivisions of Serbia

References

External links 

 

 
Populated places in Jablanica District
Municipalities and cities of Southern and Eastern Serbia